Nagwas is a village in Lalitpur District, India.

Villages in Lalitpur district, India